Elmhurst, also known as The Caldwell Place, is a historic inn and tavern located at Caldwell, Greenbrier County, West Virginia. It was built in 1824 on the banks of the Greenbrier River near where a toll bridge for the James River and Kanawha Turnpike replaced a ferry crossing in 1821. It is a two-story red brick building, consisting of a 50 feet wide by 50 feet deep main section and 50 feet by 25 feet ell. It features a two-story open portico supported by four square columns and capped by an ornamental stepped gable.  The listing also includes three contributing frame dependencies, a gravel approach driveway, an early 20th-century stone wall, and a portion of the original road bed of the James River and Kanawha Turnpike.

It was listed on the National Register of Historic Places in 1975, and a boundary increase was added in 1990.

References

Hotel buildings on the National Register of Historic Places in West Virginia
Houses on the National Register of Historic Places in West Virginia
Houses completed in 1824
Houses in Greenbrier County, West Virginia
National Register of Historic Places in Greenbrier County, West Virginia
Drinking establishments on the National Register of Historic Places in West Virginia